Chihye "Charlet" Takahashi Chung (born February 16, 1983) is an American actress who is best known for her works in voice acting, as well as for her various roles throughout film and television. She voices the fictional character D.Va in the multiplayer-shooter video game Overwatch and has reprised the role for the crossover game Heroes of the Storm. She also voiced Seraph in the shooter video game Call of Duty: Black Ops III. In television, Chung has made appearances on shows such as Cold Case, Cory in the House, 90210, Shake It Up and Grace and Frankie. In 2019, she joined the main cast of two Netflix animated series; on Carmen Sandiego as Julia Argent and on Fast & Furious Spy Racers as Margaret "Echo" Pearl.

Early life 
Chung was born as Chihye Takahashi Chung in Long Beach California, to a Japanese mother and a Korean father and is fluent and literate in 3 languages: English, Japanese, and Korean.

Chung graduated from Diamond Bar High School in 2001.

Career 

Her interest in acting began from a young age. She was discovered and signed on by an agent while on an airplane at the age of 5. She landed her first acting role on CBS's Cold Case within three months after graduating with a Bachelor in Communications from the University of California, San Diego. 
In 2016, Chung made an appearance on the Netflix television series Grace and Frankie where she starred as the character Charlotte.

Chung has also done work as a voice actress. Her video game appearances include her role as Seraph from the game Call of Duty: Black Ops 3 and her popular portrayal of D.Va from Blizzard's 2016 game Overwatch. She also voices Ally "Hoops" Nguyen in the 2022 game Grounded.

Personal life
Chung is married to Tom Yoo. In May 2019, she gave birth to a son and in November 2020 gave birth to a daughter.

Filmography

Video games

References

External links
 
 
 
 

American television actresses
American video game actresses
American voice actresses
American actresses of Japanese descent
American actresses of Korean descent
Blizzard Entertainment people
Living people
People from Long Beach, California
Actresses from California
1983 births
University of California, San Diego alumni
21st-century American women